KVWC-FM is a Country and Farm formatted broadcast radio station.  The station is licensed to Vernon, Texas and serves Vernon and Chillicothe in Texas and Davidson in Oklahoma.  KVWC-FM is owned by High Plains Radio Network and operated under their HPRN Network, LLC licensee.

References

External links
 Real Country 103.1 KVWC Online
 

1972 establishments in Texas
Country radio stations in the United States
Radio stations established in 1972
VWC-FM